Carolyn Elkins is an American poet, teacher, and editor.

Biography
Elkins received a B.A. in English from Wells College and an M.A. in English from the University of Tennessee at Knoxville. She has published three books and over 100 poems in journals in the United States and abroad. Elkins is the associate editor of Tar River Poetry, the poetry and fiction editor of POMPA,  and a founding editor of Ruby Shoes Press. She has taught in the Poets in Person Program sponsored by the NEH and Poetry magazine. She lives with her husband Bill Spencer in Cullowhee, North Carolina.

Awards
 1999, Mississippi Humanities Council teaching award
 2005, Excellence in Teaching Award at Delta State University

Bibliography 
Angel Pays A Visit. Emrys Press, 2006.  
Daedalus Rising. Emrys Press, 2002.  
Coriolis Forces. Palanquin Press, 2000.

External links 

Tar River Poetry Homepage

Writers from North Carolina
American women poets
Living people
Year of birth missing (living people)
University of Tennessee alumni
Wells College alumni
Delta State University
21st-century American women